When Somebody Loves You is the ninth studio album by American country music artist Alan Jackson. It was released on November 7, 2000, and produced the singles "Where I Come From", "www.memory", "When Somebody Loves You", and "It's Alright to Be a Redneck."

Reception
Critical reception to the album was pretty positive.  Allmusic gave the album four out of five stars, saying "Jackson gets a vote not only for holding on to the tradition but because he is able to articulate its heart in a heartless age."  While People found the album "innocuous enough" and "mildly amusing," ultimately the reviewer found it "a waste of one of the most distinctive voices in country music."

Track listing

Personnel
Alan Jackson - lead vocals
 Eddie Bayers - drums
 Stuart Duncan - fiddle, mandolin
 Larry Franklin - fiddle 
 Paul Franklin - pedal steel guitar, lap steel guitar on "Where I Come From", Dobro on "When Somebody Loves You"
 Terry McMillan - harmonica and Jew's harp on "Where I Come From"
 Brent Mason - electric guitar
 Gary Prim - keyboards, piano
 John Wesley Ryles - backing vocals on all tracks except "Meat and Potato Man"
 Keith Stegall - piano
 Rhonda Vincent - backing vocals on "I Still Love You" and "Life or Love"
 Bruce Watkins - acoustic guitar, banjo on "Life or Love"
 Glenn Worf - bass guitar

Chart performance
When Somebody Loves You peaked at #15 on the U.S. Billboard 200, and peaked at #1 on the Top Country Albums, his fifth #1 Country album. The album was certified platinum by the RIAA in August 2001.

Weekly charts

Year-end charts

Sales and Certifications

Footnotes

2000 albums
Alan Jackson albums
Arista Records albums
Albums produced by Keith Stegall